Nicholas-Hyacinthe de Botderu (1732—1801) was a French Navy officer. He notably served during the War of American Independence.

Biography 
Botderu married Jeanne de Mauduit du Plessis. They had three daughters.

In 1777, Botderu was captain of the 32-gun frigate Inconstante, part of the squadron under Du Chaffault.

In 1778, Botderu captained the 64-gun Éveillé, part of the White-and-blue squadron under Du Chaffault in the fleet under Orvilliers. He took part in the Battle of Ushant on 27 July 1778.

In 1781, he was at Saint-Domingue and in Brest. He took part in the Siege of Pensacola, commanding a 700-man landing party. On 17 July, he was given command of the 64-gun Vaillant.

On 6 March 1785, he was promoted to Brigadier des Armées navales.

Sources and references 
 Notes

Citations

References
 
 

 

External links
 
 
 

French Navy officers
French military personnel of the American Revolutionary War